Levasseur Inlet is a body of water in Nunavut's Qikiqtaaluk Region. It lies on the eastern side of Admiralty Inlet on Baffin Island's Borden Peninsula.

References

External links
 Satellite view of the inlet

Inlets of Baffin Island